"The Wonder of It All" is a single by the American dance-pop singer Kristine W. It was released as a single on January 22, 2005, and it marked the singer's ninth consecutive #1 hit on the Billboard Hot Dance Club Play chart out of nine singles released to the dance clubs and radio. It can be found on her third studio album, Fly Again.

Chart positions

See also
List of number-one dance singles of 2005 (U.S.)

References

2004 singles
Kristine W songs
2003 songs
Tommy Boy Records singles
Songs written by Kristine W